A list of all windmills and windmill sites which lie in the Ceremonial county of Hertfordshire.

Locations

A

B

C

E - G

H

K - M

N - R

S

T

W

Locations formerly within Hertfordshire

For windmills in Arkley and Totteridge see List of windmills in Greater London.
Two further mill sites at Markyate now fall within Bedfordshire and are covered under the List of windmills in Bedfordshire.

Maps

1675 John Ogilby
1676 John Seller
1695 John Ogilby
1700 Herman Moll
1720 John Warburton
1728 Clark
1749 Thomas Kitchin
1766 Dury & Andrews
1800 Ordnance Survey
1822 Andrew Bryant

Notes

Mills in bold are still standing, known building dates are indicated in bold. Text in italics denotes indicates that the information is not confirmed, but is likely to be the case stated.

Sources

Unless otherwise stated, the source for all entries is

References

Windmills in Hertfordshire
Hertfordshire
Windmills